Claudiu Cristian Bălan (born 22 June 1994) is a Romanian professional footballer who plays as a forward for Greek Super League club PAS Giannina.

Club career

PAS Giannina
On 13 September 2022, Bălan transferred to PAS Giannina.

Honours
FC U Craiova 1948
Liga II: 2020–21
Liga III: 2019–20
Liga IV: 2017–18

References

External links
 

1994 births
Living people
Sportspeople from Craiova
Romanian footballers
Association football forwards
Liga I players
Liga II players
Liga III players
Super League Greece players
FC U Craiova 1948 players
CS Mioveni players
FC Olt Slatina players
PAS Giannina F.C. players
Romanian expatriate footballers
Expatriate footballers in Greece
Romanian expatriate sportspeople in Greece